Robert Cranston (30 October 1928 – 9 June 2014) was an Indian boxer. He competed in the men's welterweight event at the 1948 Summer Olympics. At the 1948 Summer Olympics, he lost to Aurelio Díaz of Spain.

References

External links
 

1928 births
2014 deaths
Indian male boxers
Olympic boxers of India
Boxers at the 1948 Summer Olympics
People from Anantapur district
Anglo-Indian people
Indian emigrants to Canada
Canadian people of Anglo-Indian descent
Welterweight boxers